Gladys Taylor (born 5 March 1953) is a female retired British sprinter. Taylor competed in the women's 400 metres at the 1976 Summer Olympics. She represented England in the 400 metres and 4 x 400 metres relay events, at the 1982 Commonwealth Games in Brisbane, Queensland, Australia.

References

1953 births
Living people
Athletes (track and field) at the 1976 Summer Olympics
Athletes (track and field) at the 1984 Summer Olympics
British female sprinters
British female hurdlers
Olympic athletes of Great Britain
Athletes (track and field) at the 1982 Commonwealth Games
Commonwealth Games competitors for England